Isa Dick Hackett (born; Isolde Freya Dick; March 15, 1967) is an American producer and writer for Amazon who helped produce The Man in the High Castle, Philip K. Dick's Electric Dreams, and The Adjustment Bureau, all of which are based on works by her father, Philip K. Dick.

Biography 
Isa Dick Hackett was born Isolde Freya Dick in Greenbrae, California, to mother Nancy Hackett and father Philip K. Dick, the famous American science fiction writer. Hackett has helped write or produce several film adaptations of her father's works. Hackett oversees Electric Shepherd Productions with her siblings.

In the aftermath of revelations about sexual misconduct by Harvey Weinstein and the #MeToo movement in 2017, Hackett told The Hollywood Reporter that Roy Price, the programming chief at Amazon, had sexually harassed her at the 2015 San Diego Comic-Con. Hackett stated that Price aggressively asked her for sex in a taxi, which was the first time they had met, repeatedly telling her "You will love my dick" even though she assertively told him she was not interested, was a lesbian, and had a wife and children. Michael Paull, a top executive at Amazon, was in the taxi with them at the time. Later that night, Price yelled "Anal sex!" into Hackett's ear while she was in a conversation with other Amazon executives. Price was fired after an internal investigation by Amazon.

References

External links 
 

1967 births
Living people
Film producers from California
People from Greenbrae, California
American writers
American women writers
American women film producers
21st-century American women
LGBT people from California